Ihor Stolovytskyi (born 29 August 1969) is a former Soviet and Ukrainian footballer and Ukrainian football coach.

Career
He worked as a manager of FC Cherkaskyi Dnipro and previously played for FC Dnipro Cherkasy.

References

External links
 
 Stolovytskyi profile at FC Cherkaskyi Dnipro

1969 births
Living people
Sportspeople from Cherkasy
Soviet footballers
Ukrainian footballers
Ukrainian Premier League players
Ukrainian First League players
Ukrainian Second League players
Ukrainian expatriate footballers
Expatriate footballers in Russia
Ukrainian expatriate sportspeople in Russia
FC Shakhtar Donetsk players
FC Torpedo Zaporizhzhia players
FC Dnipro Cherkasy players
FC Zirka Kropyvnytskyi players
Ukrainian football managers
FC Cherkashchyna managers
FC Kremin Kremenchuk managers
Ukrainian First League managers
Association football midfielders
FC Spartak Ryazan players